Mexcala torquata is a jumping spider species in the genus Mexcala that lives in Guinea and the Ivory Coast. The female was first described by Wanda Wesołowska in 2009.

References

Salticidae
Fauna of Guinea
Fauna of Ivory Coast
Spiders of Africa
Spiders described in 2009
Taxa named by Wanda Wesołowska